Daniel Kennard (September 3, 1883 – May 21, 1947) was a Negro leagues catcher for several years before the founding of the first Negro National League, and in its first few seasons.

On July 28, 1915, 31 year-old Kennard moved from the West Baden Sprudels to become the catcher for the Indianapolis ABCs. He started his first game for the A.B.C.s by pitching.

Kennard died at the age of 63 in St. Louis, Missouri and is buried at St. Peter's Cemetery in Hillsdale, MO.

References

External links
 and Baseball-Reference Black Baseball stats and Seamheads

Negro league baseball managers
Chicago American Giants players
French Lick Plutos players
St. Louis Giants players
Indianapolis ABCs players
Detroit Stars players
St. Louis Stars (baseball) players
St. Louis Giants (1924) players
1883 births
1947 deaths
Baseball players from St. Louis
West Baden Sprudels players
Baseball catchers
20th-century African-American people